The Das Almas River is a river of São Paulo state in southeastern Brazil.
It is a tributary of the Paranapanema River.

The river rises in the Serra de Paranapiacaba near the Intervales State Park, and in its upper reaches flows through the   Xitué Ecological Station, created in 1987.

See also
List of rivers of São Paulo

References

Rivers of São Paulo (state)